The Blazing Sun may refer to:

The Blazing Sun (1950 film), an American western film by John English
The Blazing Sun (1954 film), an Egyptian romance/drama film by Youssef Chahine